This is a list of Australian films from 2000 to present. For a complete alphabetical list, see :Category:Australian films.

2000
List of Australian films of 2000

2001
List of Australian films of 2001

2002
List of Australian films of 2002

2003
List of Australian films of 2003

2004
List of Australian films of 2004

2005
List of Australian films of 2005

2006
List of Australian films of 2006

2007
List of Australian films of 2007

2008
List of Australian films of 2008

2009
List of Australian films of 2009

2000s
Australia
Films